Mihlali Mpafi (born 17 June 1992 in Mdantsane, South Africa) is a South African rugby union player for the  in the Currie Cup and the Rugby Challenge. His regular position is hooker.

Playing career

Youth / Amateur rugby

He played for Border at various age groups since the age of 12, culminating in representing them in South Africa's premier high school rugby union tournament, the Under-18 Craven Week held in Welkom in 2010.

He was named in the matchday squad for all thirteen of the  side's matches during the 2011 Under-19 Provincial Championship, starting three of those and playing off the bench in seven of their matches. He helped the side finish in fourth spot on the log to secure the final semi-final spot and also came on during their semi-final match against the s, but could not prevent them slipping to a 13–48 defeat.

At the end of 2011, Mpafi was named in a South Africa Under-20 training squad that prepared for the 2012 IRB Junior World Championship However, he was not included in the final squad that participated in the tournament.

In 2012, he was included in the  squad for the 2012 Vodacom Cup, but he didn't make any appearances in the competition, instead representing club side Bloemfontein Police at the final edition of the National Club Championships held in Rustenburg.

Border Bulldogs

He returned to East London to play for the Border Bulldogs in 2013, but injury struck, ruling him out for the entire season. However, his chance came in the 2014 Vodacom Cup, where he started five of their matches.

He started their opening match of the 2014 Currie Cup qualification series against  to make his Currie Cup debut before being named in the starting line-up for four of their remaining five matches in the competition. Having lost all six of their matches, they qualified to the 2014 Currie Cup First Division competition, where Mpafi started a further three matches.

He made seven appearances during the 2015 Vodacom Cup – four starts and three appearances from the bench – as the Border Bulldogs emulated their 2014 record, winning just one of their seven matches in the competition. He started their opening match of the 2015 Currie Cup qualification series, helping his side secure a famous victory over a  side that eventually topped the log in the competition to qualify for the 2015 Currie Cup Premier Division.

At the start of 2016, Mpafi was one of six Border Bulldogs players that joined the ' Super Rugby squad for a trial period as they prepared for the 2016 Super Rugby season. However, he returned to Border Bulldogs after he failed to be contracted for the Super Rugby side.

References

1992 births
Living people
People from Mdantsane
South African rugby union players
Rugby union hookers
Border Bulldogs players
Rugby union players from the Eastern Cape